Anbariya Sunni Community is an independent Islamic religious and cultural organization. It was founded by Yusuf Soalih Ajura and has its headquarters in Tamale, Ghana. It is headed by Saeed Abubakr Zakaria.

References

Religious organisations based in Ghana